René Kos (born 17 October 1955) is a retired cyclist from the Netherlands. He had his best achievements in motor-paced racing, winning the world championships in 1981 and finishing in second place in 1983; he also finished second in 1980 but was disqualified for failing the doping test. He won the national motor-paced cycling championships in 1981, 1982, 1984 and 1985.

As a track cyclist he competed in 28 six-day races with the best result of third place in the race of Buenos Aires.

After retirement he worked as a cycling coach. He was also active as a race organizer and a pacer in motor-paced racing. In 2009, he was invited to prepare the Iranian track team for the 2010 Asian Games, but had to refuse due to the uncertain security situation. He is the manager of the cycling team Koga-CreditForce-Ubbink, which includes his three sons Patrick, Jesse and Christian.

Teams 
 1980  – AGU Sport
 1981  – AGU Sport 
 1982  – individueel  
 1982  – Amko Sport  
 1983  – AGU Sport  
 1984  – Paganini  
 1985  – Panasonic  
 1986  – Timmermans IJzerhandel   
 1987  – Timmermans IJzerhandel

References

1955 births
Living people
Dutch male cyclists
People from Langedijk
UCI Track Cycling World Champions (men)
Cyclists from North Holland
Dutch track cyclists